Dora Mills Adams (October 24, 1874 – July 31, 1943) was an American film actress. She is best known for her appearance in the short film Dr Jeykll and Mr Hyde as Mrs. Lanyon.

Career 
Mills entered the New York film industry near its birth in 1914 and may have been in theatre or vaudeville beforehand. As one of the older and plumper actresses she usually played matriarchal roles.

Mills died of myocarditis on July 31, 1943, at 485 Rugby Road in Kings County in Brooklyn, New York, at the age of 68. She is buried in the Locust Section of Woodlawn Cemetery, Bronx.

Filmography

References

External links 

1874 births
1943 deaths
People from Brooklyn
American film actresses
20th-century American actresses